Joel M. Miller (born 1943) is an American politician from the state of New York. He represented District 102 in the New York State Assembly, which comprises Hyde Park, Fishkill, the town of Poughkeepsie, Clinton, Wappinger and La Grange within Dutchess County, New York. He is a Republican.

Miller served in the United States Air Force on active duty from 1967 to 1969, remaining in the Air Force Reserve as a captain until approximately 1977. He is currently a major in the New York State Guard.

After returning to New York in 1969, Miller established a dental practice in Poughkeepsie, which he maintained for the ensuing three decades. He served as a member of the executive committee of the Duchess County Dental Society for 26 years. He served as treasurer of the same organization for five years and was its president for two years. He was once the president of the Mid-Hudson Dental Management and Marketing Corporation and is still a member of its executive committee. He was re-elected in 2008, defeating Democrat Jonathan Smith.

Miller holds a B.S. from the City College of New York, as well as a D.D.S. from Columbia University's School of Dental and Oral Surgery.

References

1943 births
Living people
Republican Party members of the New York State Assembly
Columbia University College of Dental Medicine alumni
Politicians from Dutchess County, New York
American dentists
United States Air Force officers
City College of New York alumni